The 4th Dimension Tour was the concert tour by British boy band JLS. The tour supported their third studio album Jukebox which was released on 14 November 2011. The tour visited Ireland and the United Kingdom.

Background
The tour was officially announced via the band's website on 2 September 2011, with UK arena dates only being announced. Irish dates were later announced on 9 September. Beginning in Liverpool's Echo Arena on 15 March, JLS will visit cities across the UK and Ireland throughout March and April 2012. Tickets for the tour went on sale on 9 September with shows selling out resulting in extra shows being added across the UK. Six extra dates were later added on 14 September. On 28 September, three extra shows were announced for London's O2 Arena, Manchester Arena and Glasgow's Braehead Arena. A matinee show was added at The O2 Arena in London on 24 March with proceeds going to Sport Relief.

The support acts for the tour were NVS, Starboy Nathan and Vida, a new girl group managed by Oritsé Williams from the band. Vida also performed at 24 March Sport Relief matinee show, alongside Olly Murs and Rizzle Kicks who were special guests for that show only. Highlights of theirs and JLS' performance were filmed and broadcast the same day on BBC Three in a show entitled JLS Sing for Sport Relief.

Setlist
"Take You Down"
"The Club Is Alive"
"Teach Me How to Dance"
"Take a Chance on Me"
"Beat Again"
"3D"
"One Shot"
"So Many Girls"
"Earthquake" (Labrinth cover)
"Outta This World"
"Eyes Wide Shut"
"Go Harder"
"Everybody in Love"
"Yeah 3x" / "Beautiful People" (Chris Brown covers)
"OMG" / "DJ Got Us Falling In Love" (Usher covers)
"Love You More"
"That's My Girl"
"She Makes Me Wanna"'''Encore
"Proud"
"Do You Feel What I Feel?"

Tour dates

Festivals and other miscellaneous performances
JLS performed two shows that day.
This concert was a part of "Rays of Sunshine Concert"
This concert was a part of "Sound City Festival"
This concert was a part of "iTunes Festival"

 Cancelled performances
 The SoundCity festival dates for Inverness and Carlisle were cancelled due to a hectic schedule for JLS

Box office score data

References

External links
Official Tour Page

2012 concert tours